The William G. Kenaston House, located at 301 Dartmouth in Newell, South Dakota, was built in 1911.  It was listed on the National Register of Historic Places in 1984.

It is a -story brick house with a hipped roof.  It has a wood porch supported by Doric columns wrapping around two sides of the house.

References

Houses completed in 1911
National Register of Historic Places in Butte County, South Dakota
Houses on the National Register of Historic Places in South Dakota
Houses in Butte County, South Dakota